Kyuhee Park (born 1985) is a classical guitarist who was born in Incheon, South Korea and raised in South Korea and Japan.

Biography
Park began her guitar studies at age three in Yokohama, Japan. At age nine, she won first prize in the Youth Division of the National Korean Guitar Competition, followed by a string of first prizes in national in international competitions. She moved back to Japan at age fifteen. She enrolled in the Tokyo College of Music in 2004 and studied with Japanese classical guitarists Shin-Ichi Fukuda and Kiyoshi Shomura and later with Álvaro Pierri at the Vienna Music University. She has participated in opera tours conducted by Seiji Ozawa and in 2009 she took part in the "Guitar Fiesta" in Hakuju Hall, Tokyo. She also performed in Carnegie Hall in New York in October 2012.

Competitions
Park has won an unusual number of first prizes in international competitions, to wit:

 2005, Korean guitar music competition, 1st Prize  
 2007, Heinsberg International Guitar Competition, 1st Prize and Audience Prize  
 2008, Printemps de la Guitare International Competition, 1st Prize (Park is the first female to win first prize; she is the first Asian to do so in this competition's history)  
 Koblenz international Guitar Competition, 2nd Prize 
 2009, Liechtenstein Guitar Festival ligita, International ligita Guitar Competition, 1st Prize
 2009, 2011 Michele Pittaluga International Classical Guitar Competition, 2nd Prize 
 2010, Agustin Barrios International Guitar Competition, 1st Prize  
 2012, Alhambra International Guitar Competition, 1st Prize and Audience Prize 
 2014 Jan Edmund Jurkowski Memorial Guitar Competition.

Recordings

In 2010, Park made her first album, Sueño (Dreams) on the FONTEC label in Japan, and in 2012 she recorded another album, Sonate Noir. She collaborated with Nippon Columbia Inc. and released the album Spanish Journey in August 2012.

She also recorded a recital CD for Naxos in 2013 which won the "American Record Guide Critic's Choice" award. (Naxos 8.573225)

External links

 YouTube

References

1985 births
South Korean classical guitarists
Living people
Musicians from Incheon
Classical guitarists
21st-century guitarists